The Men's 67 kg weightlifting event at the 2022 Commonwealth Games took place at the National Exhibition Centre on 31 July 2022.

Records
Prior to this competition, the existing world, Commonwealth and Games records were as follows:

The following records were established during the competition:

When the previous records and weight classes were discarded following readjustment, the IWF defined "world standards" as the minimum lifts needed to qualify as world records (WR), CommonWealth Authority defined "Commonwealth standards" and "Commonwealth games standards" as the minimum lifts needed to qualify as Commonwealth record (CR) and Commonwealth games record (GR) in the new weight classes. Wherever World Standard/Commonwealth Standard/Commonwealth Games Standard appear in the list above, no qualified weightlifter has yet lifted the benchmark weights in a sanctioned competition.

Schedule
All times are British Summer Time (UTC+1)

Results

References

External links

Weightlifting at the 2022 Commonwealth Games